Ischyrolampra is a genus of leaf beetles in the subfamily Eumolpinae. They are found in South America.

Species
 Ischyrolampra batesi (Baly, 1878)
 Ischyrolampra clavicornis (Bechyné, 1951)
 Ischyrolampra rosalei Bechyné & Bechyné, 1967

References

Eumolpinae
Chrysomelidae genera
Beetles of South America
Taxa named by Édouard Lefèvre